Djadoeg Djajakusuma (1 August 1918 – 28 October 1987) was an Indonesian film director and promoter of traditional art forms. Born to a nobleman and his wife in Temanggung, Central Java, Djajakusuma became interested in the arts at a young age, choosing to pursue a career in theatre. During the Japanese occupation from 1943 to 1945 he was a translator and actor, and in the four-year national revolution which followed he worked for the military's educational division, several news agencies, and in drama.

In 1951, Djajakusuma joined the National Film Corporation (Perfini) at the invitation of Usmar Ismail. After making his directorial debut with Embun, Djajakusuma released a further eleven films with the company before leaving in 1964. He then returned to traditional Indonesian theatre, including wayang. Although he continued to direct movies independently of Perfini, most of his energies were dedicated to promoting traditional art forms and teaching cinematography. After over a decade of poor health and high blood pressure, Djajakusuma collapsed during a ceremony and died. He was buried in Karet Bivak Cemetery.

The dedicated but easily angered Djajakusuma was influenced by Usmar Ismail's realist views, although he focused more on traditional aspects of life. His theatrical performances attempted to modernize traditional forms so that they could be better received in a modern world. He is credited with revitalising the Betawi theatre form lenong and received numerous awards for his filmmaking, including a lifetime achievement award at the Indonesian Film Festival.

Biography

Early life
Djajakusuma was born on 1 August 1918 in Parakan, Temanggung, Central Java, Dutch East Indies, to a priyayi father, Raden Mas Aryo Djojokoesomo, and his wife Kasimah. Djajakusuma was the fifth child of six born to the couple, who lived comfortably off Djojokoesomo's salary as a government official. While young he enjoyed watching stage performances, such as wayang puppetry and the traditional dance form tayuban; at times he would furtively leave his home after bedtime to watch the productions. With his friends, he would act out the bedtime stories his mother told him. When imported Hollywood films began to be screened, he was an avid viewer, watching Westerns and works starring Charlie Chaplin.

Owing to his position as the son of a nobleman, Djajakusuma was able to receive an education. He completed his studies in Semarang, Central Java, graduating from the natural sciences programme at a senior high school there in 1941. Although his family hoped that he would become a government employee like his father, Djajakusuma decided to go into the performing arts. He returned to his hometown for a short time before realising that he would have little opportunity in Parakan. Accordingly, in early 1943 – almost a year after the Indies were occupied by the Empire of Japan – Djajakusuma moved to the colony's political centre, Jakarta, to find work.

Djajakusuma became employed at the Cultural Centre as a translator and actor under Armijn Pane. Among the works he translated were several pieces by the Swedish playwright August Strindberg and Norwegian playwright Henrik Ibsen, as well as a history of Japan and several kabuki stage plays. While with the centre, Djajakusuma wrote several of his own stage plays. In his free time, Djajakusuma helped establish the amateur theatre company Maya, together with artists such as HB Jassin, Rosihan Anwar, and Usmar Ismail. The troupe, formed in response to a desire for greater artistic freedom, performed translations of European works and original works by Ismail and El Hakim. To promote a sense of Indonesian nationalism while still conforming with the Japanese censorship bureau's rules, several of Maya's plays did not explicitly promote Japan, but rather the Greater East Asia Co-Prosperity Sphere. Themes supporting the Indonesian nationalist movement, meanwhile, remained implicit in the works. With Maya, Djajakusuma travelled from village to village, putting on performances.

Indonesian National Revolution
President Sukarno proclaimed Indonesia's independence on 17 August 1945, days after the bombings of Hiroshima and Nagasaki. Expecting the Dutch colonial government to return, Djajakusuma and Ismail helped establish the Independent Artists (Seniman Merdeka) as a form of resistance. The group travelled throughout the city, spreading news of Indonesia's proclaimed independence while performing from an open-air truck. After the arrival of the Netherlands Indies Civil Administration, the group sometimes attempted to spy on the Europeans or hide information which would be considered useful to the returning Dutch forces. Owing to this dangerous work, Djajakusuma began carrying a pistol, and went to Banten to ask a kyai to make him impervious to bullets.

In early 1946, with the Dutch colonial forces in control of Jakarta, Djajakusuma fled to the new national capital at Yogyakarta. There, he spent a time with the national news agency Antara before joining the military's educational division, rising to the rank of captain. For the military Djajakusuma edited the weekly Tentara; he also contributed articles to Ismail's cultural magazine Arena. Despite his involvement in the press, he did not abandon the theatre; with Surjo Sumanto, he established a troupe which performed for soldiers and raised morale, sometimes travelling to the frontlines.

Djajakusuma was hired by the Ministry of Information in 1947 to teach at a school for the performance arts, the Mataram Entertainment Foundation. Through Mataram, he and Ismail were introduced to filmmakers Andjar Asmara, Huyung, and Sutarto; the two studied under these more established individuals. Meanwhile, Djajakusuma was put in charge of censoring radio broadcasts in Republican-held areas, a duty he held until the Dutch captured Yogyakarta on 19 December 1948. Djajakusuma fled the city, then met up with Republican forces. Using an old radio and a bicycle-powered generator, Djajakusuma listened to international news broadcasts and wrote them down; the information from these broadcasts was then printed in underground newspapers.

After the Indonesian National Revolution ended with Dutch recognition of Indonesia's independence in 1949, Djajakusuma continued to work as a journalist for Patriot (a rebranding of Tentara) and the magazine Kebudajaan Nusantara; Mataram was reopened, and Djajakusuma began teaching there again while managing the Soboharsono cinema and writing several stage plays. Ismail, meanwhile, went back to Jakarta and established the National Film Corporation (or Perfini); its first production, Darah dan Doa (The Long March), which gave a fictionalised version of the Siliwangi Division's trek from Yogyakarta to West Java in 1948, was directed by Ismail and released in 1950.

Career with Perfini
In preparation for his second film, Enam Djam di Jogja (Six Hours in Yogyakarta), Ismail recalled Djajakusuma to Jakarta. For the film, Djajakusuma helped Ismail adapt the General Assault of 1 March 1949 for the screen. Production was completed on a low budget; Djajakusuma later recalled that their camera had to be powered by a car battery. Despite this and other difficulties, Djajakusuma stayed on after the film's completion, completing another work for Perfini, Dosa Tak Berampun (Unforgivable Sin), later that year. Ismail served as director for this film, about a man who leaves his family after he is transfixed by the smile of a waitress.

While Ismail, who remained head of Perfini, went abroad to study cinematography at the School of Theater, Film and Television at the University of California, Los Angeles, Djajakusuma began taking a larger role in Perfini. He made his directorial debut in 1952 with Embun (Dewdrop), which showed the psychological troubles faced by soldiers upon returning to their village after the revolution. The film was shot in Wonosari, at the time in the middle of a drought, to provide a visual metaphor for the barren souls of the warriors. Because of its depiction of traditional superstitions, the film had trouble with both the censorship bureau and critics; superstition was considered incompatible with the new republic's need for modernisation. The release of Embun made Djajakusuma one of four directors to work for Perfini; the others were Ismail, Nya Abas Akup, and Wahyu Sihombing.

Djajakusuma's next production, Terimalah Laguku (Take My Song; 1952), was a musical about an old, impoverished musician who sells his saxophone to help his former student's career. Though the film's technical quality was poor, when he returned to Indonesia in 1953 Ismail was pleased with the work, stating that the editing had been done well. Over the next year Ismail conveyed information he learned at UCLA to the Perfini staff; Djajakusuma followed these lessons closely. This was followed by Harimau Tjampa (Tiger from Tjampa) in 1953, a film about a man who attempts to avenge his father's death. Set amidst Minang culture, the film featured some of the first nudity in a domestic production and was a considerable critical success.

In 1954 Djajakusuma directed two comedies, Putri dari Medan (Daughter of Medan) and Mertua Sinting (Insane Parents-in-Law). The first dealt with three young men who resolve to never marry, only for their strength to waver after meeting some women from Medan, while the second followed a man who rejects his son's choice of spouse owing to her lack of noble descent, then unknowingly chooses the same woman to be his son's wife. The following year Djajakusuma helped establish the Indonesian Screen Actors Guild (PARFI). His only film that year, the drama Arni, told of a man who married another woman while his sick wife went to Padang, Sumatra, for treatment.

Djajakusuma studied cinematography in the United States, first at the University of Washington in Seattle, then at the University of Southern California's School of Cinematic Arts, from 1956 to 1957. When he returned to Indonesia, he worked with Ismail and fellow Perfini employee Asrul Sani to establish the National Theatre Academy of Indonesia, which promoted realism; the Indonesian dramatist Putu Wijaya described the realism promoted by the academy as more Indonesian than Western, while Djajakusuma considered inspired by the Italian neorealist movement. Djajakusuma remained a lecturer with the academy until 1970, and his students considered him humorous and easy to approach.

Upon his return to Indonesia, Djajakusuma began work on Tjambuk Api (Whips of Fire; 1958), a critique of the widespread corruption in Indonesia; this theme led to the film being held by the censorship bureau for almost a year. The director followed this with the drama Pak Prawiro (Mr. Prawiro), which was sponsored by the Post Savings Bank and meant to convey the importance of having savings. During this period he studied the traditional theatre of India, travelling to Calcutta, Madras, and New Delhi; he hoped that this first-hand experience would inspire him in the filming of traditional Indonesian stories.

In 1960 Djajakusuma released his first film based on traditional wayang stories, Lahirnja Gatotkatja; the traditional puppetry had fascinated him as a child, and he greatly enjoyed the character Gatotkaca. Shot in Yogyakarta, the film featured a cast of stars from Jakarta and local talent in backing roles. It was, however, controversial: dhalang and others versed in wayang argued that the director had ignored too many traditional aspects of the puppetry. That year Djajakusuma also served as production manager for Ismail's Pedjuang (Warriors for Freedom) and directed Mak Tjomblang (Mrs. Tjomblang), a comedy adapted from Nikolai Gogol's 1842 drama Marriage.

Djajakusuma released another comedy, Masa Topan dan Badai (Time of Cyclones and Storms), in 1963; the film centres around the family dynamics of a conservative father, liberal mother, and their two teenaged daughters who are in the throes of adolescence. The following year Djajakusuma directed his last film with Perfini, Rimba Bergema (Echoing Jungles), which was meant to promote the nation's rubber industry. That year he helped establish the Film and TV Employee's Union, a response to the Lekra-sponsored Indonesian Film League. As with Ismail and most Perfini employees, Djajakusuma was staunchly against the communist-affiliated Lekra; the cultural group was likewise hostile towards those affiliated with Perfini.

Later career

Towards the end of his time with Perfini, Djajakusuma again became active in traditional arts. He devoted considerable time towards the promotion of wayang. In 1967 he organised the National Wayang Festival, which collapsed shortly afterwards owing to a lack of funds. In 1967 he directed the wayang-inspired film Bimo Kroda for Pantja Murti Film, which used the destruction of the Pandawa – brothers in the Hindu epic Mahābhārata – to represent the kidnappings and subsequent murders of five army generals during the 30 September Movement in 1965. Djajakusuma's involvement with wayang continued into the early 1970s; he organised two Wayang Weeks, in 1970 and 1974, as well as a national wayang festival in 1977. Furthermore, he established two wayang orang troupes, Jaya Budaya (1971) and Bharata (1973), hoping to save the ailing medium by modernising it.

Meanwhile, Djajakusuma helped promote art forms such as the Betawi lenong and Javanese ludruk over a period of several years. He is particularly recognised for his revitalising lenong. Beginning in 1968, Djajakusuma appeared on television as an advocate of lenong, which was then limited to rural villages and on the verge of dying out. He increased popular knowledge of the form while arguing for proper remuneration for performers. Through the 1970s lenong was performed at Ismail Marzuki Hall, drawing considerable audiences, and several lenong performers found mainstream acclaim in the film industry.

Djajakusuma also promoted non-traditional cultural activities, both modern and foreign. In 1968 he became the head of the Jakarta Art Council, a position he held until 1977, and in 1970 he held a kroncong music festival. Beginning with the school's establishment in 1970, he became a lecturer at the Jakarta Institute for Arts Education (later the Jakarta Art Institute [, or IKJ]), teaching cinematography. To better understand the world's theatre, in 1977 he went to Japan and China to study their traditions. He later led the students in various stage performances, including adaptations of Japanese noh and Chinese opera; several of these performances were held at Ismail Marzuki Hall. In the 1970s Djajakusuma held a variety of positions in film organisations, including as a member of the Film Council (1974–76), a member of the board of trustees for Radio and TV Broadcasts (1976), and a member of the Bureau for the Development of National Film (1977–78).

Djajakusuma's productivity in the film industry, however, declined. In 1971 he directed his final films, Api di Bukit Menoreh (Fire on Mount Menoreh) and Malin Kundang (Anak Durhaka) (Malin Kundang [Faithless Child]). The first, released for Penas Film Studio and based on a novel by Singgih Hadi Mintardja, followed soldiers from the Kingdom of Pajang in their efforts to subdue soldiers from the rival kingdom of Jipang. The second film was an adaptation of the Malay folktale of the same name. Starring Rano Karno and Putu Wijaya as the title character, the film follows a young boy who forgets his roots after spending much of his childhood at sea. His last role as a filmmaker was in 1977, when he helped produce Fritz G. Schadt's comedy Bang Kojak (Brother Kojak; 1977).

Final years and death
In 1977 Djajakusuma served on the jury of the Indonesian Film Festival (or FFI). While reading the decision, he collapsed and was rushed to the hospital, while Rosihan Anwar completed the reading. Djajakusuma's neighbour and frequent collaborator Taufiq Ismail told reporters that it was not the first time Djajakusuma had collapsed. Djajakusuma continued to suffer from bouts of sudden weakness for the rest of his life, caused by high blood pressure.

Despite his rapidly failing health, Djajakusuma remained active in the arts. In 1980 he made his last film appearance, and his only role on the big screen, acting in Ismail Soebardjo's Perempuan dalam Pasungan (Woman in Stocks). He and Sofia WD portrayed parents who regularly put their daughter in stocks to punish her for being disobedient; in an interview with Suara Karya, Soebardjo recalled that, from the time he had written it, he had only considered Djajakusuma for the role. Perempuan dalam Pasungan won the Citra Award for Best Film at the 1981 Indonesian Film Festival, and Djajakusuma expressed an interest in making several further films; this was, however, never realised. In 1983 Djajakusuma served as dean of the Faculty of Arts at IKJ, and in 1984 he went to the Three Continents Festival in Nantes, France, where two of his films were shown to critical acclaim.

In early 1987 Djajakusuma's doctor diagnosed him with heart disease, which led Djajakusuma to begin dieting and stop smoking. He continued to be highly respected in Indonesian film circles, but was displeased with the condition of the country's film industry, which he considered to be on the verge of collapse. This he blamed on American cultural imperialism, which meant that most cinemas preferred screening foreign films, especially those from Hollywood, and that Indonesian youth were no longer creating a uniquely Indonesian identity.

Djajakusuma collapsed on 28 October 1987 while giving a speech in commemoration of the Youth Pledge at the IKJ, striking his head on a stone step. After being rushed to Cikini General Hospital, he was declared dead at 10:05 a.m. local time (UTC+7). He was buried at Karet Bivak Cemetery that evening, after ceremonies at the IKJ led by the author Sutan Takdir Alisjahbana and prayers at the Amir Hamzah Mosque in Ismail Marzuki Hall led by the poet Taufiq Ismail. Among the mourners were the former Minister of Information Boediardjo, the Minister of Education and Culture Fuad Hassan, and the Deputy Governor of Jakarta Anwar Umar.

Djajakusuma had never married, but left behind several nieces and nephews whom he had raised as his own children. After his death, newspapers throughout Jakarta carried obituaries by such cultural and film figures as Alisjahbana, the producer Misbach Yusa Biran, and the Perfini cameraman Soemardjono. These obituaries emphasised Djajakusuma's role in the development of the Indonesian film industry and the preservation of traditional culture. In a ceremony commemorating the fifth anniversary of Djajakusuma's death, all his documents and books were donated to the IKJ library.

Style

Like Usmar Ismail, Djajakusuma was influenced by realism. However, while Ismail preferred to focus on national-level themes, Djajakusuma was more drawn to simple, locally relevant storylines with educational messages. This realism carried over into Djajakusuma's work in wayang. The settings, traditionally drawn, were instead created as three-dimensional sets, including representations of trees, rocks, and water. According to Soemardjono, who often edited Djajakusuma's films, the director enjoyed experimenting with new techniques to better convey his intentions.

Djajakusuma often included traditional arts in his films, and two of them (Lahirnja Gatotkatja and Bimo Kroda) were based on traditional wayang stories and used wayang-inspired costumes and tempos. This focus on aspects of traditional culture fell out of the mainstream after 1965, having been replaced by films about city life. Djajakusuma's theatrical productions experimented with new storytelling techniques, adapting the traditional styles for the modern world. As a lecturer teaching screenwriting and the history of theatre, Djajakusuma focused on Indonesian arts. He argued that Indonesians should rely on local culture, not continuously look towards the West. In other areas he was mostly apolitical.

The Indonesian sociologist Umar Kayam, who had served on the Jakarta Art Council with Djajakusuma, described the director as highly disciplined. Biran described him as having a fiery temper which could be triggered suddenly, yet quick to calm when the trigger was removed; this sentiment was echoed by several people who had worked with Djajakusuma. Coverage in the film magazine Djaja described him as hardworking and highly dedicated to his craft, to the point of forsaking romantic relationships.

Reception

Djajakusuma's film Harimau Tjampa garnered him the Best Screenplay Award at the 1954 Asian Film Festival. His later film Bimo Kroda was recognised by the Indonesian Department of Information for promoting traditional culture. In 1970 he received an Art Award from the Indonesian government for "his service to the State as the Main Promoter of the Development of Modern Drama". At the 1987 Indonesian Film Festival, he received a special award for his contributions to the film industry, and in November 2003 he was posthumously granted a Budaya Parama Dharma Award by President Megawati Sukarnoputri for his contributions to the development of Indonesian culture.

Critical reception has been positive. The award-winning director Teguh Karya cited the works of Djajakusuma, Usmar Ismail, and Asrul Sani as "legendary" and among his greatest influences. Choreographer Bagong Kussudiardjo reportedly so respected Djajakusuma that he had named his son Djadoeg after the director. According to a memorial in the newspaper Kompas, Djajakusuma was also dubbed a "living legend" during his visit to Nantes. A later Kompas article records Djajakusuma's best-remembered works are Harimau Tjampa and Tjambuk Api. Those two works are those most often shown, owing to the fact that ready-to-use copies are stored at Sinematek Indonesia; his other surviving films are kept as negatives.

Filmography

Cast
Perempuan dalam Pasungan (Girl in Stocks; 1980) – as Mr. Prawiro

Crew
Enam Djam di Jogja (Six Hours in Yogya; 1951) – as screenwriter
Embun (Dewdrop; 1951) – as director and screenwriter
Dosa Tak Berampun (Unforgivable Sin; 1951) – as screenwriter
Terimalah Laguku (Take My Song; 1952) – as director
Harimau Tjampa (Tiger from Tjampa; 1953) – as director and screenwriter
Putri dari Medan (Girl From Medan; 1954) – director
Mertua Sinting (Insane Parents-in-Law; 1954) – as director
Arni (1955) – as director
Tjambuk Api (Whips of Fire; 1958) – as director
Pak Prawiro (Mr. Prawiro; 1958) – as director and screenwriter
Pedjuang (Warriors for Freedom; 1960) – as production manager
Mak Tjomblang (Mrs. Tjomblang; 1960) – as director and screenwriter
Lahirnja Gatotkatja (Birth of Gatotkatja; 1960) – as director and screenwriter
Masa Topan dan Badai (Time of Cyclones and Storms; 1963) – as director
Rimba Bergema (Echoing Jungles; 1964) – as director
Bimo Kroda (1967) – as director
Malin Kundang (Anak Durhaka) (Malin Kundang [Faithless Child]; 1971) – as director
Api Dibukit Menoreh (Gugurnya Tohpati) (Fire on Mount Menoreh [Death of Tohpati]; 1971) – as director
Bang Kojak (Brother Kojak; 1977) – as producer

Explanatory notes

References

Works cited

External links

1918 births
1987 deaths
Citra Award winners
Indonesian male actors
Indonesian film directors
Indonesian screenwriters
People from Temanggung Regency
20th-century Indonesian male actors
USC School of Cinematic Arts alumni
University of Washington alumni
20th-century screenwriters